Schizognathina, Ohaus, 1918, is a subtribe of scarab beetles, belonging to the tribe Anoplognathini.

Genera
 Amblochilus Blanchard, 1851
 Amblyterus  MacLeay, 1819
 Bilobatus  Machatschke, 1970
 Clilopocha  Lea, 1914
 Dungoorus  Carne, 1958
 Eosaulostomus  Carne, 1956
 Exochogenys  Carne, 1958
 Mesystoechus  Waterhouse, 1878
 Mimadoretus  Arrow, 1901 syn Popillia  MacLeay, 1887
 Pseudoschizognathus  Ohaus, 1904
 Saulostomus  Waterhouse, 1878
 Schizognathus  Fischer Von Waldheim, 1823
 Trioplognathus  Ohaus, 1904
 Phalangogonia  Burmeister, 1844

References

External links

Rutelinae
Insect subtribes